Baud (Baod in Breton) is a commune in the Morbihan département in Brittany in northwestern France.

Overview
There are many flower beds on the approaches to the town and in the area around the church. The "Town Centre" is the highest point of the town in the area besides the Church. Baud is essentially a market town, a location where the local farmers used to trade their goods for services. Baud is situated on the crossroads of two major roads bisecting Brittany: the North South Road, which links Saint-Brieuc and Saint-Malo on the north coast to the ancient towns of Vannes and Lorient on the south coast, and the East West Road which links Rennes (the capital of Brittany) to Quimper (an old cultural capital). The Quimper Road then continues on to the tip of Brittany at Brest.

Baud is the administration centre for a number of small villages in the vicinity. It has a police station, fire brigade, ambulance, a large  secondary school, a school of music and dance - "la maison des arts", a library and a selection of sporting facilities including a swimming pool, tennis courts, two football fields and a stadium. It also has a number of primary schools including a diwan school teaching in the Breton language.

It has a fair range of social outlets. A cinema, the "Celtic", which is unusual in rural France, a nightclub called "Le Podium" and a selection of restaurants and pubs and similar. There is a small market held on Saturdays where animals such as rabbits, turkeys, ducks and chickens can be purchased. There are several supermarkets including Champion, Lidl, Intermarché and a number of bakeries. There are a number of pharmacies, medical doctors and nursing services in the town.

There are many festivals that take place in and around Baud. These include the beer festival, the camion cross, the auto cross, the music festival and the festival of traditional crafts.

The town's population is about 6000, and is growing each year. There are extensive small scale property developments particularly to the west of the town. Over the last few years, Baud has become popular as a location to have a holiday or retirement home and there is a growing number of estate agents.

The Blavet river basin is a local beauty spot. This river links with the Canal de Nantes à Brest at Pontivy. There are extensive cycle / pedestrian paths along the riverbank.

The famous statue Vénus de Quinipily is situated on the outskirts of Baud

Geography
The Ével forms most of the commune's eastern border, flows westward through the middle of the commune, forms part of its western border, then flows into the Blavet, which forms the commune's north-western border.

Baud is at the crossroad between Pontivy, Lorient and Vannes which makes Baud a good town to take a halt.

Population
Inhabitants of Baud were called Baudais, but now they are called Baldiviens.

Breton language
In 2008, 10.7% of primary-school children attended bilingual schools.

See also
Communes of the Morbihan department
Henri Gouzien, sculptor of Baud War Memorial

References

External links

 Town website 
  
 

Communes of Morbihan